Live at Rome Olympic Stadium is a live album and video by English rock band Muse, which was released on 29 November 2013 in CD/DVD formats. On 5 November 2013, the film received theatrical screenings in 20 cities worldwide, and the next day it was screened for one night only in 40 other territories. The album contains the band's performance at Rome's Stadio Olimpico on 6 July 2013, in front of a crowd of 60,963 people. The concert was a part of The Unsustainable Tour, which is a moniker for the band's summer 2013 European leg of The 2nd Law World Tour.

Filming and production
The cameras which brought the concert to screen were sixteen Sony PMW-F55 CineAlta 4K cameras, and with a variety of cinema lenses, including 5 Angenieux 24/290s, an Elite 120/520, a number of Optimo 14/52's and with Fujinon 19–90 Cabrio and 85–300 Cabrio.
Furthermore, a crane, a Towercam, various hotheads and a Spidercam were used. All images were recorded in HD and 4K on three terabyte hard drives. Alongside video, 120 lines of multi-track audio were recorded, all redundant.
The result of all of this was 4 sets with material, 2 main sets and 2 back-up sets.

The show was directed by Matt Askem (with whom the band worked on two previous videos, Hullabaloo: Live at Le Zenith, Paris and HAARP), and produced by Serpent Productions.

Additional songs that were performed on the night but omitted on the album were; "Map of the Problematique", "Dracula Mountain", "Liquid State", "Stockholm Syndrome", "Unintended" and "Blackout". In addition, "The 2nd Law: Isolated System" was shortened on the release.

Release
The album was released on 29 November 2013 in the CD/DVD and CD/Blu-ray formats.

The 4K format was screened in theatres in 20 cities worldwide on 5 November 2013, and in 40 other territories the next day. The film was screened in the US and Canada on 6 November 2013, in Europe, UK, Australia and Japan on 7 November 2013, on 12 November 2013 in Austria, Germany, Italy and Spain, 19 November 2013 in Poland, and 22–24 November 2013 in Indonesia.

Track listing

Notes

1. "Hysteria" is preceded by "Interlude" from Absolution (2003).
2. "Knights of Cydonia" is preceded by "Man with a Harmonica", written by Ennio Morricone, and used as an intro.

Credits

Muse
Matthew Bellamy – lead vocals, lead guitar, piano, production, mixing
Christopher Wolstenholme – bass, backing vocals, rhythm guitar, lead vocals on "Liquid State", production, mixing
Dominic Howard – drums, backing vocals on "Supermassive Black Hole", production, mixing

Additional musicians
Morgan Nicholls – keyboards, synthesizers, backing vocals, cabasa on "Supermassive Black Hole", other assorted percussion, electronics, guitar on "Madness" and "Starlight"

Additional personnel
Chris Lord-Alge – mixing
Chris Vaughan – Production Manager
Tommaso Colliva – recording
Matt Askem – directing
Tim Woolcott – editing
Thomas Kirk – screen visuals
Ted Jensen – mastering
Hans-Peter Van Velthoven – artwork, photography

Charts and certifications

Weekly charts

Year-end charts

Certifications

Release history

References

External links

Muse (band) live albums
Muse (band) video albums
2013 films
2013 live albums
2013 video albums
Live video albums
Live albums recorded at Stadio Olimpico
2010s English-language films